James Harold Quick  (October 4, 1917 – March 9, 1974) nicknamed "Blondie", was a shortstop in Major League Baseball who played for the Washington Senators in the 1939 season.

References

External links

1917 births
1974 deaths
Major League Baseball shortstops
Washington Senators (1901–1960) players
Americus Cardinals players
Greenville Spinners players
Jersey City Giants players
Macon Peaches players
Nashville Vols players
Springfield Nationals players
Williamsport Grays players
Baseball players from Georgia (U.S. state)
Sportspeople from Rome, Georgia

Quick x. Quick was the shortstop for the 1949 Nashville Vols in the AA Southern Association.